Euonymus cornutus is a species of flowering plant in the genus Euonymus, native to Tibet, central China and Myanmar. Its putative variety Euonymus cornutus var. quinquecornutus, called the fivehorned spindle, has gained the Royal Horticultural Society's Award of Garden Merit.

References

cornutus
Plants described in 1893